Danilo Xavier Carrera Huerta (born January 17, 1989) known as Danilo Carrera, is an Ecuadorian actor, presenter and model.

Biography 
Carrera was born in Guayaquil, Ecuador, to Xavier Carrera and Elsita Huerta. He is the oldest of five children, with siblings Leopoldo, Xavier, Felipe and Juan. Carrera studied in Balandra Cruz School of Southern Ecuador. He began his career in modeling in Ecuador, appearing in fashion shows, commercials for Toni, and also worked with De Prati and Abercrombie & Fitch. One of his greatest passions is football. In 2007 he was part of the Ecuadorian team Emelec sub-18, which were crowned champions. In 2008 Carrera joined the Ecuadorian team Barcelona Sporting Club in which he played until 2009. Apart from pursuing his career in acting, Carrera continues playing football in a local team in Miami. He was previously married to Andrea Viteri, and to Angela Rincon.

Television roles

References

External links 

1990 births
Living people
Ecuadorian male film actors
Ecuadorian male telenovela actors
21st-century Ecuadorian male actors
People from Guayaquil